Inishcoo is a small island and a townland off the coast of County Donegal, Ireland. The closest town on the mainland is Burtonport.

Geography
The island is located around 1.5 km East of Arranmore and South-West of the small island of Eighter. A footbridge connects the two islets, both known for pleasant sandbeaches.
The inner part of Inishcoo is mainly rocky (granite) and bears a small lake.

History
A small community used to live on Inishcoo in the first part of the 20th century.
Some of the old houses are used as holiday homes; the biggest is a former coast-guard building in the south-western part of the island.

References

Photo gallery

See also

 List of islands of Ireland

Islands of County Donegal
Townlands of County Donegal